Taihape is in the Rangitikei District of the North Island of New Zealand. It serves a large rural community. State Highway 1, which runs North to South through the centre of the North Island, passes through the town.

History and culture

Early history
The Taihape region was originally inhabited by Māori. These iwi (tribes) still live in the area. The first record of a European to the region is William Colenso's visit in 1845. In 1884, the surveyor's party for the Main Trunk railway line cut a rough track through the district.

The town was founded in 1894, when European settlers arrived from Canterbury in the South Island. The site of the town was a small natural clearing in dense native bush, which the first settlers set about clearing. Many of the original families have descendants still living in the area. The settlement was first called Hautapu after the local river, then Otaihape ("the place of Tai the Hunchback"), and finally Taihape.

Before the establishment of the railway, the bulk of farming produce (wool) had to be transported east by horse and bullock cart to Napier, from where it was exported. Until the establishment of roads and railways in the early 1900s, Taihape, like other rural towns, remained largely an isolated pioneer settlement.

Recent history

Taihape developed as a key railway and transport town, reaching its peak of population and activity during the heyday of the 1950s and 1960s. The town declined during the downturn of the 1980s and today it is largely a refreshment stop for travellers and a service point for the local farming community.

Taihape is home of the annual Gumboot Day, first celebrated on 9 April 1985. This festival was devised by local business people who decided to capitalise on its rural image. Taihape's association with gumboots is marked by a large sculpture of a gumboot positioned prominently on the edge of town. Local business owners commissioned the New Zealand sculptor Jeff Thomson to produce the oversized gumboot using his signature material, corrugated iron. Entertainer John Clarke used Taihape as a location for his Fred Dagg comedy persona.

Marae

There are five marae in the Taihape area, where local iwi and hapū meet:

 Kuratahi Marae and Te Karere meeting house is affiliated with the Ngāti Rangi hapū of Ngāti Rangituhia and Ngāti Parenga
 Opaea Marae and Tumakaurangi meeting house is affiliated with the Ngāti Tūwharetoa hapū of Ngāti Tamakōpiri
 Raketapauma Marae and Rangituhia meeting house is affiliated with the Ngāti Rangi hapū of Ngāti Rangituhia
 Tamakopiri Marae and Tumakaurangi meeting house is affiliated with the Ngāti Kahungunu hapū of Ngāti Tama
 Winiata Marae and Tautahi meeting house is affiliated with the Ngāti Hauiti hapū of Ngāti Hinemanu and Ngāti Te Ngahoa, and the Ngāti Kahungunu hapū of Ngāti Hinemanu and Ngāti Paki

In October 2020, the Government committed $836,930 from the Provincial Growth Fund to upgrade a cluster of 7 marae, including Opaea Marae and Raketapauma Marae, creating 95 jobs. It also committed a further $239,367 towards Raketapauma Marae and another marae, creating 34 jobs.

Economy 

Taihape is a rural supply town and at its peak during the 1960s, was the main railway and transport hub for the surrounding farming community. Much of its economic activity revolved around the railway and rural communities. A major decline occurred in the 1980s due to a restructure and electrification of the railway system and a general downturn in the farming sector.

In recent years and with the advent of major tourist attractions, Taihape is now experiencing an upturn in local commerce. Its location on the North Island Main Trunk railway and on State Highway 1 has ensured its economic survival.  Taihape's main claim to fame is as the "Gumboot Capital of the World", and it attracts large numbers of people to the annual gumboot-throwing contest.

Geography 

Taihape is near the confluence of the Hautapu and Rangitikei rivers about 500 m (1500 ft) above sea level. It lies in a sheltered valley among the high country of the central North Island, close to the Rangitikei River and the Ruahine Ranges. It is surrounded by fertile high country ideal for sheep and deer farming and its location close to the mountains, rivers and lakes has made it an important service hub for hunting and outdoor tourism. The town is located at the southern edge of the volcanic plateau.

Transport routes in and out of Taihape have improved over the years and what were once twisting and treacherous roads through the high country are now easy and fast deviations through the hills to Mangaweka in the south and Waiouru to the north. 
Taihape's climate is temperate. There is significant rainfall throughout the year in Taihape. According to the Köppen climate classification, this climate is classified as oceanic climate (Cfb). The average annual temperature is 11.5 °C and about 953 mm of precipitation falls annually.

People 
Population peaked at around 3,500 in the late 1960s, but declined in parallel with many other rural towns after that time.

There were 684 households. There were 855 males and 861 females, giving a sex ratio of 0.99 males per female. The median age was 40.2 years (compared with 37.4 years nationally), with 369 people (21.5%) aged under 15 years, 297 (17.3%) aged 15 to 29, 741 (43.2%) aged 30 to 64, and 309 (18.0%) aged 65 or older.

Ethnicities were 69.1% European/Pākehā, 47.9% Māori, 4.4% Pacific peoples, 3.7% Asian, and 1.2% other ethnicities (totals add to more than 100% since people could identify with multiple ethnicities).

The proportion of people born overseas was 10.1%, compared with 27.1% nationally.

Although some people objected to giving their religion, 45.1% had no religion, 37.9% were Christian, 0.3% were Hindu, 0.5% were Muslim, 0.2% were Buddhist and 6.3% had other religions.

Of those at least 15 years old, 117 (8.7%) people had a bachelor or higher degree, and 369 (27.4%) people had no formal qualifications. The median income was $27,100, compared with $31,800 nationally. The employment status of those at least 15 was that 684 (50.8%) people were employed full-time, 243 (18.0%) were part-time, and 24 (1.8%) were unemployed.

Railways
Taihape Railway Station was an important railway stop on the North Island Main Trunk line, with a marshalling yard and locomotive depot until the late 1970s. 
There were many railway houses situated along the length of Mataroa Road; now only three remain. At one time Taihape had two lodges of the Royal Antediluvian Order of Buffaloes. One of the lodges was named Kaikoura Lodge No 226 (after the local Kaikoura River) this lodge survived until 2007. The lodge once had its own lodge rooms. The former railways house painted purple located on the highway traveling south into Taihape was once one of the two Buffaloes halls. The lodge in Taihape once boasted  a large membership due in part to the numbers of Railways and Post Office staff stationed in the town.

In 1999 Tranz Rail demolished the historic Taihape Railway Station. The Refreshment Rooms still stand on the former station platform, as do the old goods shed and locomotive depot compound at the south end of the rail yard. After a long period of fund-raising by Rotary, a loco turntable was re-purchased and installed in the station yard, so that special trains can run to Taihape and turn around for the return run.

Government and politics

Local politics
As part of the Rangitikei District, the current Mayor of Rangitikei since 2013 is Andy Watson.

Taihape is the main town in the Taihape ward of the Rangitikei District Council, which elects three of the eleven district councillors. The three councillors of the Taihape ward are Richard Aslett, Angus Gordon and Ruth Rainey. The mayor and councillors are all due for re-election in October 2016.

National government
Taihape, like the rest of the Rangitikei District, is located in the general electorate of Rangitīkei and in the Māori electorate of Te Tai Hauāuru. Rangitīkei is a safe National Party seat since the 1938 election with the exception of 1978–1984 when it was held by Bruce Beetham of the Social Credit Party. Since 2011 it is held by Ian McKelvie.

Te Tai Hauāuru is a more unstable seat, having been held by three different parties since 1996, i.e. New Zealand First, the Māori Party and the Labour Party. Since 2014 it is held by Adrian Rurawhe of the Labour Party.

Education

The school was established in 2005 through the amalgamation of Taihape's primary and secondary schools due to the declining rolls at both schools.

The school was established in 1916.

Notable people

 Douglas MacDiarmid, artist
 Nehe Milner-Skudder, rugby union player
 Nash Chase, entertainer
 Moke Belliss, rugby union player

References

External links

Taihape in the Cyclopaedia of New Zealand, 1908

Populated places in Manawatū-Whanganui
Rangitikei District